The 2003 NCAA Division I baseball tournament was held May 30 through June 23, . Sixty-four NCAA Division I college baseball teams met after having played their way through a regular season, and for some, a conference tournament, to play in the NCAA tournament. The tournament culminated with 8 teams in the College World Series at historic Rosenblatt Stadium in Omaha, Nebraska.

ESPN, which held the rights to the College World Series, began televising super regional games in 2003. As part of the contract with ESPN, four super regionals would begin on Friday and run through Sunday, while the other four super regionals would begin Saturday and run through Monday.

The 2003 College World Series saw a format change and the championship was decided by a best-of-three series. From 1950 through 1987, the College World Series was a true double elimination tournament. From 1988 through 2002, there were two double elimination pools, with the winner of each facing off in a one game championship. 

In the 2003 championship series, Rice defeated Stanford two games to one. John Hudgins became the 16th player to win the College World Series Most Outstanding Player Award from a losing team.

Bids

Automatic bids
Conference champions from 30 Division I conferences earned automatic bids to regionals. The remaining 34 spots were awarded to schools as at-large invitees.

Bids by conference

Tournament notes
 UC Riverside, Illinois-Chicago, and UNC Wilmington were making their first NCAA tournament appearance.

CWS records tied or broken
Total attendance: 260,091
Largest margin of victory in a championship game: 12
Stanford became the first team to lose three games at one College World Series.

National seeds
Bold indicates CWS participant.

Rice
Stanford

Miami (FL)

Regionals and super regionals
Bold indicates winner.

Tallahassee Super Regional

Baton Rouge Super Regional

Columbia Super Regional

Columbus Super Regional

Houston Super Regional
The Houston Super Regional was hosted by Rice at Reckling Park.

Palo Alto Super Regional

Fullerton Super Regional

Coral Gables Super Regional

College World Series

Participants

Bracket

Championship series

Saturday 6/21 Game #1

Sunday 6/22 Game #2

Monday 6/23 Game #3

All-Tournament Team

The following players were members of the College World Series All-Tournament Team.

References

NCAA Division I Baseball Championship
NCAA Division I Baseball Championship
Baseball in Austin, Texas
Baseball in Houston